Feng Zemin (born 18 January 1958) is a Chinese archer. He competed in the men's individual event at the 1984 Summer Olympics.

References

1958 births
Living people
Chinese male archers
Olympic archers of China
Archers at the 1984 Summer Olympics
Place of birth missing (living people)
Asian Games medalists in archery
Archers at the 1982 Asian Games
Asian Games bronze medalists for China
Medalists at the 1982 Asian Games
20th-century Chinese people